Fjodor Koltšin (24 February 1957 – 8 April 2018) was an Estonian skier who represented the Soviet Union at the 1980 Winter Olympics.

Born in Moscow to Alevtina Kolchina and Pavel Kolchin,  Fjodor Koltšin attended the University of Tartu. He was married to Laive Poska, with whom he had two children.

References

External links
 

1957 births
2018 deaths
Soviet male Nordic combined skiers
Nordic combined skiers at the 1980 Winter Olympics
Olympic Nordic combined skiers of the Soviet Union
University of Tartu alumni
Skiers from Moscow